Provincial Trunk Highway 30 (PTH 30) is a provincial highway in the Canadian province of Manitoba. It runs from the Neche–Gretna Border Crossing at the Canada–United States border (where it meets with North Dakota Highway 18) to PTH 14.

The highway connects the U.S. border and PTH 14 to the town of Altona. The speed limit is 100 km/h (62 mph).

History
PTH 30 was known as PTH 14A before receiving its current designation in 1968.

Major intersections

References

030